Mark Anderson (born February 14, 1986) is an American professional golfer who has played on the Web.com Tour and the PGA Tour.

Anderson joined the Web.com Tour in 2010. In his rookie year on Tour he recorded three top-10 finishes. In 2011, he recorded four top-10 finishes and a runner-up finish at the Miccosukee Championship en route to finishing 22nd on the money list, good enough for a PGA Tour card for 2012.

On the PGA Tour in 2012, Anderson failed to make the top 200 in the FedEx Cup standings. He made 13 out of 25 cuts, but only recorded one top-10 finish all season, a T9 at the season finale. He finished 155th on the money list, losing his PGA Tour card.

Anderson returned to the Web.com Tour for the 2013 season. In May 2013, Anderson won his first professional tournament at the BMW Charity Pro-Am. He won by five strokes and set a new scoring record for the event in the process, finishing at 27-under-par for the week. It was his 60th start on the Web.com Tour. He finished eighth on the 2013 Web.com Tour regular season money list to earn his 2014 PGA Tour card.

In 2014, his season was cut short due to injury.  He made only 3 cuts in 8 events and finished 212th on the FedEx Cup points list, therefore he lost his PGA Tour card and also missed the Web.com Tour Finals.  He had a limited injury exemption for the 2015 PGA Tour.

Amateur wins (3)
2003 South Carolina Junior Amateur
2008 Players Amateur
2009 Master of the Amateurs

Professional wins (2)

Korn Ferry Tour wins (2)

See also
2011 Nationwide Tour graduates
2011 PGA Tour Qualifying School graduates
2013 Web.com Tour Finals graduates
2016 Web.com Tour Finals graduates
2019 Korn Ferry Tour Finals graduates

External links

American male golfers
South Carolina Gamecocks men's golfers
PGA Tour golfers
Korn Ferry Tour graduates
Golfers from Maryland
Golfers from South Carolina
Sportspeople from Annapolis, Maryland
Sportspeople from Beaufort, South Carolina
1986 births
Living people
21st-century American people